George Erwin Gullett Stephens (April 8, 1873 – April 1, 1946) was a college football player. He caught the first forward pass in the history of the sport. He was later a journalist who also sold insurance and real estate.

University of North Carolina
He was a prominent running back for the North Carolina Tar Heels football team of the University of North Carolina. He was selected third-team for an all-time Carolina football team of Dr. R. B. Lawson in 1934. Joel Whitaker selected him first-team for his all-time UNC squad.

1895
It is thought that the first forward pass in football occurred on October 26, 1895 in a game between Georgia and North Carolina when, out of desperation, the ball was thrown by the North Carolina back Joel Whitaker instead of punted. Stephens caught the ball and ran 70 yards for a touchdown. He was selected All-Southern.

Myers Park
Stephens was much involved in the expansion of Myers Park.

Journalist
He was joint president and publisher of the Charlotte Observer and joint owner and publisher of the Asheville Citizen.

References

1873 births
1946 deaths
American football halfbacks
American male journalists
American real estate brokers
19th-century players of American football
North Carolina Tar Heels football players
All-Southern college football players
Sportspeople from Asheville, North Carolina
People from Summerfield, North Carolina
Players of American football from North Carolina